Trail Airport  is located  southeast of Trail, British Columbia, Canada and is situated in a valley beside the Columbia River. The airport serves both Trail and nearby Nelson and Castlegar.

The airport consists of one  asphalt runway and provides a GPS approach from the north (runway 16) and the south (runway 34).

Since April 10, 2006, Pacific Coastal has been flying into the airport using their Beechcraft 1900s, and occasionally their bigger Saab 340s.

In December 2017, with funding from the B.C. Air Access Program, the City of Trail built a new 4,200 sq.ft. airport terminal building to give the 22,000+ yearly travelers a better travel experience with designated drop-off and pick-up zones, ample short-term and long-term parking, and a spacious waiting area.

Airlines and destinations

References

External links 
For airport homepage see http://www.trail.ca/en/regional-airport.asp
For airport information see http://www.trail.ca/en/Airport-Information.asp
For airport economic development information see http://www.trail.ca/en/Airport-Economic-Development.asp
For airport news see http://www.trail.ca/en/Trail-Regional-Airport-News.asp
For airport webcams see http://www.trail.ca/en/Live-Web-Cam.asp
For airline information see http://www.trail.ca/en/Airline-Information.asp

Certified airports in British Columbia
West Kootenay